Ripley's Game (1974) is a psychological thriller by Patricia Highsmith, the third in her series about the con artist and murderer Tom Ripley.

Plot summary
Tom Ripley continues enjoying his wealthy lifestyle in Villeperce, France, with his wife, Heloïse. He spends his days living comfortably in his house, Belle Ombre, until an associate, the American criminal Reeves Minot, asks him to commit murder for him. Ripley—who "detest[s] murder, unless absolutely necessary"—turns down the offer of $96,000 for two hits, and Minot goes back to Hamburg.

The previous month, Ripley had gone to a party in Fontainebleau, where he was insulted by the host, Jonathan Trevanny, a poor British picture framer suffering from myeloid leukemia. As revenge, Ripley suggests to Minot that he might try to convince Trevanny to commit the murders. To ensure that the plan will work, Ripley starts a rumor that Trevanny has only months to live, and suggests that Minot fabricate evidence that Trevanny's leukemia has worsened, though Minot does not. Trevanny, who fears his death will leave his wife and son destitute, accepts Minot's offer of a visit to a medical specialist in Hamburg. There, he is persuaded to commit a murder in exchange for money.

After carrying out the contract—a shooting in a crowded U-Bahn station—Trevanny insists that he is through as a hired gun. Minot invites him to Munich, where he visits another doctor. Minot persuades Trevanny to kill a Mafia boss, this time on a train using either a garrotte or a gun. Trevanny reluctantly gives in and gets on the train. He resolves to shoot the mafioso and commit suicide before he can be caught, asking Minot to ensure that his wife gets the money. But before Trevanny can go through with it, Ripley, feeling guilty about getting Trevanny into the situation, shows up and executes the mafioso himself. He asks Trevanny not to tell Minot that he has "assisted" with the assassination.

Trevanny's wife Simone discovers a Swiss bank book with a large sum in his name and starts to suspect that he is hiding something from her. She links the rumor about her husband's condition to Ripley and asks Trevanny to tell her how he has been making so much money. Trevanny is unable to explain it to her and asks Ripley to help concoct a credible story. Ripley acknowledges his role in Trevanny's dilemma and promises to shepherd him through the ordeal. The Mafia become suspicious of Minot's involvement with the murders and bomb his house, prompting him to flee. Ripley begins to fear Mafia revenge when he receives a couple of suspicious phone calls. After sending Heloise and their housekeeper away, Ripley asks Trevanny to help him deal with any Mafia reprisals at Belle Ombre.

When two Mafia hitmen turn up at Belle Ombre, Ripley kills one and forces the other to phone his boss in Milan and say that Ripley is not the man they are after before being executed. Simone then shows up at the house demanding answers, discovers the corpses, and is sent away in a taxi. Ripley and Trevanny drive to a remote village to burn the corpses in their own car. A few days later, Ripley visits Trevanny's house, where a quartet of Mafia gunmen appear. One of them opens fire on Ripley, but Trevanny steps in front of him and is mortally wounded; he dies in Ripley's car on the way to hospital. Ripley is unsure whether Trevanny's action was by accident or design.

A few months later, Ripley encounters Simone in Fontainebleau, and she spits at him. He realizes that Simone has accepted her husband's blood money, and in doing so has remained silent about her suspicions of Ripley's instigation of the entire affair.

Reception
In The New York Times, Christopher Lehmann-Haupt wrote that the novel "gets off to a very strong beginning" and described how he appreciated the plot once Ripley set it in motion and stood back. He concluded:

Adaptations

Film
 Ripley's Game was adapted in 1977 by Wim Wenders as Der Amerikanische Freund, starring Dennis Hopper as Ripley. 
 It was adapted under its original title in 2002 by director Liliana Cavani, with John Malkovich as Ripley.

Radio
The 2009 BBC Radio 4 adaptation stars Ian Hart as Ripley, Helen Longworth as Heloise, Tom Brooke as Trevanny, Paul Rider as Minot and Janice Acquah as Simone.

References

External links
 Two Faces of Ripley, filmbrain.com comparison of The American Friend and Ripley's Game
 Ripley's Game at Fact Behind Fiction 

1974 American novels
Novels by Patricia Highsmith
American novels adapted into films
Novels about organized crime
Heinemann (publisher) books
Novels set in Hamburg
Novels about serial killers